Frank M. Conaway Jr. (born January 4, 1963) is an American politician who represents the 40th legislative district in the Maryland House of Delegates. Conaway is a member of the House Judiciary Committee and the Legislative Black Caucus of Maryland.

Background
Conaway was born on January 4, 1963, in Baltimore to Frank M. and Mary Conaway. He attended Baltimore City public schools and completed the 10th grade at Northwestern High School.   After attending different colleges in the Baltimore area, Conway earned a B.A. in business administration from Sojourner-Douglass College in Baltimore. He is also the author of the book "Baptist Gnostic Christian Eubonic Kundalinion Spiritual Ki Do Hermeneutic Metaphysics: The Word: Hermeneutics."

Political career
During the four-year term prior to Conaway's candidacy for the House of Delegates, two of the delegates, Howard "Pete" Rawlings and Tony Fulton, died while in office. Marshall Goodwin and Catherine Pugh were appointed to finish their terms. Rawlings and Fulton were Democrats, as are Goodwin and Pugh. Prior to the 2006 democratic primary, the only incumbent delegate in the district, Salima Marriott, decided to run for the Senate seat being vacated by the district's senator. Catherine Pugh also decided to run for the same seat leaving the newly appointed Goodwin as the only incumbent in the race. The vacancies drew a large crowd of contenders; including Conaway, Barbara Robinson and Shawn Tarrant, who all finished ahead of Goodwin. The general election in November, therefore, saw all newcomers win all the seats.

House of Delegates
Once sworn in as a member of the Maryland House of Delegates, Conaway was assigned to the House Judiciary Committee where he has sponsored a number of bills aimed at police practices and public safety. In 2014, Conaway was the first Maryland legislator to sponsor a bill requiring body-worn cameras for police officers.

Legislative notes
Co-sponsored HB 860 (Baltimore City Public Schools Construction and Revitalization Act of 2013). Signed by the Governor on May 16, 2013, the new law approved 1.1 billion dollars to construct new schools in Baltimore City.
 voted for the Clean Indoor Air Act of 2007 (HB359) BILL INFO-2007 Regular Session-HB 359
 voted in favor of prohibiting ground rents(SB24) 2007 Regular Session - Vote Record 0250
 voted for the Tax Reform Act of 2007(HB2) Wayback Machine
 voted in favor of in-state tuition for illegal immigrants in 2007 (HB6)2007 Regular Session - Vote Record 0690
 sponsored House Bill 30 in 2007, Maryland Education Fund - Establishment and Funding House Bill 30

YouTube videos
In late October 2014, Conaway received significant attention after he uploaded more than 50 videos to YouTube. In the videos, which were characterised as "rambling" and "bizarre", he talked about cryptograms in Ancient Egyptian carvings, the Book of Revelation, talking horses, Rubik's Cube, Sasquatch and Yeti. He also wondered if he was a hologram, referred to himself as "meta", advocated his weight loss book The 20 Pennies a Day Diet Plan by talking about canned chicken, Arizona Diet Green Tea and sugar free hard candies and promoted his other books, Trapezium Giza Pyramid Artificial Black Hole Theory, Baptist Gnostic Christian Eubonic Kundalinion Spiritual Ki Do Hermeneutic Metaphysics: The Word: Hermeneutics and Christian Kundalini Science- Proof of the Soul- Cryptogram Solution of Egyptian Stela 55001- & Opening the Hood of Ra.

In a phone interview with The Baltimore Sun, Conaway claimed to have deciphered artwork at the Walters Art Museum and said that it was "part of my duties as a Christian" to try and "spread the knowledge that I have". He also talked about Moses, Egyptian Obelisks, the "Frankenfish", the Fibonacci number and faces on Mars and said that he did not "believe" in evolution, arguing that "Darwin [said] that we descended from monkeys... I haven't seen any evidence to say man came from a monkey."

The videos appeared to have been filmed in the Baltimore City Hall mail room, where he had also worked since being hired as a clerk at the Municipal Post Office by Comptroller Joan Pratt in 2006. In November 2014, he resigned from his City Hall job and took down the videos. They have been preserved by web developer Chris Cook, who argues that Conaway is not fit to hold office.

Despite widespread mockery and a general election write-in campaign from State Delegate Shawn Z. Tarrant, who had finished fourth in the Democratic primary for the three-seat district (there were no Republican candidates for the district), Conaway was re-elected in the 2014 elections.

Electoral history
2006 Race for Maryland House of Delegates – 40th District
Voters to choose three:
{| class="wikitable"
|-
!Name
!Votes
!Percent
!Outcome
|-
|- 
|Frank M. Conaway Jr. Dem.
|16,432
|  32.4%
|   Won
|-
|-
|Barbara A. Robinson, Dem.
|16,032
|  31.6%
|   Won
|-
|-
|Shawn Z. Tarrant, Dem.
|13,921
|  27.5%
|   Won
|-
|-
|Jan E. Danforth, Green
|4,135
|  8.2%
|   Lost
|-
|Other Write-Ins 
|177
|  0.3%
|   
|-
|}

References

Democratic Party members of the Maryland House of Delegates
African-American state legislators in Maryland
Politicians from Baltimore
1963 births
Living people
American spiritual writers
21st-century American politicians
21st-century African-American politicians
20th-century African-American people